Rei Matsumoto (松本 怜,Matsumoto Rei, born February 25, 1988) is a Japanese football player for J-Lease FC from 2023.

Career
Matsumoto studied and played for Waseda University from 2006 until his graduation on 2009.

Matsumoto began his professional career with Yokohama F. Marinos on 2010.

On 7 January 2013, Matsumoto was loaned out to Oita Trinita. Two years later, his loan became permanent as he was signed by Oita on a full transfer. He left the club after ten years on 2022.

On 25 December 2022, Matsumoto was officially announced as a new signing for J-Lease FC, to play the 2023 season in the Kyushu Soccer League.

Career statistics
Updated to the end of 2022 season.

1Includes J3 Relegation Playoffs.

References

External links
 
 
 

1988 births
Living people
Waseda University alumni
Association football people from Hokkaido
Japanese footballers
J1 League players
J2 League players
J3 League players
Yokohama F. Marinos players
Oita Trinita players
J-Lease FC players
Association football midfielders
People from Muroran, Hokkaido